Al-Aḥsāʾ (al-ʾAhsā), also known as al-Ḥasāʾ or Hajar, is a traditional oasis historical region in eastern Saudi Arabia whose name is used by the Al-Ahsa Governorate, which makes up much of that country's Eastern Province.

Al-Ahsa Oasis composed four main cities and 22 villages. Two of these four main cities are Al-Mubarraz and Al-Hofuf, which are two of the 15 largest cities in Saudi Arabia.

A large part of the Oasis is the Empty Quarter, also referred to as Rub' al Khali in Arabic. The Empty quarter covers almost three quarters of the land in the oasis whereas the residential areas constitute to 18% of the area of the oasis.

There are more than 2.5 million palm trees including date palms in the oasis, which is fed from a huge underground aquifer and irrigated by the flow of more than 280 artesian springs, which allows agriculture all year round in a region that is otherwise sand desert.

Al-Ahsa is part of the region known historically for its high skill in tailoring, especially in making bisht, a traditional men's cloak. Al-Bahrain geographical province is in Eastern Arabia, which includes the eastern coast of the Arabian Peninsula down to the borders of the UAE, Oman, and also includes the island of Awal (modern-day Bahrain). Historically, Al-Ahsa was the main city in Al-Bahrain province, making up most of its population and providing most of its agricultural output.

The site became a World Heritage site in 2018. It has also been part of the UNESCO Creative Cities Network since December 2015. According to one author, the oases of Al-Ahsa and Al Ain (in the UAE, on the border with Oman) are the most important in the Arabian Peninsula.

Etymology
Al-Ahsa is the plural form of "Al-Ḥisā" which refers to a landscape of accumulated sand with an impermeable layer underneath. When rain falls onto such a landscape, the water soaks through the sand (which also protects it from evaporation), and is retained by the impermeable base layer, forming an aquifer. A well drilled into the land produces a sweet cold spring.

The area used to be called Pit-Ardashir by Assyrians and Persians.

History

Ancient history 
Al-Ahsa has been inhabited since prehistoric times, due to its abundance of water in an otherwise arid region. Natural fresh-water springs have surfaced at oases in the region for millennia, encouraging human habitation and agricultural efforts (date palm cultivation especially) since prehistoric times.

The oasis region and specifically the name Hajar (also Hagar, Haǧar) may be related to the Ancient Near East toponym Agarum, mentioned in Dilmunite inscriptions as the original home of their chief deity Inzak. If so, Agarum probably referred to the mainland area of Arabia lying opposite Bahrain. According to the hypothesis, the Dilmun civilization originated at the oases of Eastern Arabia, but later relocated to the isle of Bahrain. This interpretation is not without criticism, however, and other sources place Agarum on the isle of Failaka.

Islamic times
Eastern Arabia was conquered by the emerging Rashidun Caliphate during the 7th century. It was later inherited by the Umayyads and Abbasids. In 899 A.D., the region came under the control of the Qarmatian leader, Abu Tahir al-Jannabi, and was declared independent from the Abbasid Caliphate of Baghdad. Its capital was at al-Mu'miniya near modern Hofuf. By circa 1000, Al-Ahsa became the 9th largest city worldwide supporting 100,000 inhabitants. In 1077, the Qarmatian state of Al-Ahsa was overthrown by the Uyunids. Al-Ahsa subsequently fell under the rule of the Bahrani dynasty of the Usfurids, followed by their relatives, the Jabrids, who became one of the most formidable powers in the region, retaking the islands of Bahrain from the princes of Hormuz. The last Jabrid ruler of Bahrain was Muqrin ibn Zamil.

In 1521, the Portuguese Empire conquered the Awal Islands (the islands that comprise present day Bahrain) from the Jabrid ruler Muqrin ibn Zamil, who fell strongly in battle. The Jabrids struggled to maintain their position on the mainland in the face of the Ottomans and their tribal allies, the Muntafiq.  In 1550, Al-Ahsa and nearby Qatif came under the sovereignty of the Ottoman Empire with Sultan Suleiman I. Al-Ahsa was nominally the Eyalet of Lahsa in the Ottoman administrative system, and was usually a vassal of the Porte. Qatif was later lost to the Portuguese.

The Ottomans were expelled from Al-Ahsa in 1670, and the region came under the rule of the chiefs of Banu Khalid tribe.

Al-Ahsa, along with Qatif, was incorporated into the Wahhabist Emirate of Diriyah in 1795, but returned to Ottoman control in 1818 with an invasion ordered by Muhammad Ali of Egypt. The Banu Khalid were again installed as rulers of the region but, in 1830, the Emirate of Nejd retook the region.

Direct Ottoman rule was restored in 1871, and Al-Ahsa was placed first under Baghdad Vilayet and with Baghdad's subdivision Basra Vilayet in 1875. In 1913, ibn Saud, the founder of modern Saudi Arabia, annexed Al-Ahsa and Qatif into his domain of Najd.

Saudi independence
On 2 December 1922, Percy Cox officially notified Kuwait's Emir Sheikh Ahmad Al-Sabah that Kuwait's borders had been modified. Earlier that year, Major John More, the British representative in Kuwait, had met with Ibn Saud of Saudi Arabia to settle the border issue between Kuwait and Najd. The result of the meeting was the Uqair Protocol of 1922, in which Britain recognized ibn Saud's sovereignty over territories claimed by the emir of Kuwait.

Al-Ahsa was taken from the Ottomans in 1913, bringing the Al Sauds control of the Persian Gulf coast and what would become Saudi Arabia's vast oil reserves.

Economy

Historically, Al-Ahsa was one of the few areas in Arabian Peninsula in which rice was grown. In 1938, petroleum deposits were discovered near Dammam, resulting in the rapid modernization of the region. Today, Al-Ahsa is home to the largest conventional oil field in the world, the Ghawar Field.

Al-Ahsa is known for its palm trees and date palms. Al-Ahsa has over 2.5 million palm trees which produce over 100 thousand tons of dates every year.

The oasis is a popular tourist destination for Qatari nationals, who would make the 100-mile cross-border drive to visit local attractions, as well as to find bargains for food, spices and clothing in Al-Ahsa's bazaars. Economic ties were severely disrupted by the Qatar diplomatic crisis, which led to the closure of Saudi Arabia's land border with Qatar. With the crisis' resolution and border reopening in 2021, however, Qatari tourists have gradually returned to Al-Ahsa; albeit in smaller numbers, due to improved Qatari self-sufficiency in goods.

Tourist sites

Springs
The number of springs and freshwater sources in Al-Ahsa oasis range from 60 to 70, including those of Ummsaba'ah, Al-Harrah and Al-Khadod.

Antiquities
Al-Ahsa oasis has a number of important archaeological sites.

Landmarks
 12 locations were defined as the Cultural Landscape of Al-Ahsa Oasis (the World Heritage site):

 Eastern Oasis
 Northern Oasis
 As-Seef
 Suq Al-Qaysariyah
 Qasr Khuzam
 Qasr Sahood
 Qasr Ibrahim
 Jawatha archaeological site
 Jawatha Mosque
 Al-'Oyun village
 Ain Qannas archaeological site
 Al-Asfar lake

Climate
Al-Ahsa has a hot desert climate (Köppen Climate Classification: BWh), with long, extremely hot summers and short, very mild winters.

See also

 List of World Heritage sites in Saudi Arabia

References

External links
 Al-Ahsa municipality website
 Tor Eigeland, 1970, "The Twice-Used Water", Saudi Aramco World
 Jon Mandaville, 1974, "Al-Hasa: Outpost of Empire", Saudi Aramco World

Arabian Peninsula
Eastern Province, Saudi Arabia
Historical regions in Saudi Arabia
Historical regions
History of the Middle East
Oases of Saudi Arabia
World Heritage Sites in Saudi Arabia